Marriage in Europe includes:
Western European marriage pattern 
Recognition of same-sex unions in Europe
Marriage in Austria
Marriage in Cyprus
Marriage in the Czech Republic
Marriage in Germany
Marriage in Greece
Marriage in the Republic of Ireland
Marriage in Poland
Marriage in Russia
Marriage in Slovakia
Marriage in Spain
Marriage in Turkey
Marriage in the United Kingdom
Marriage in England and Wales
Marriage in Northern Ireland
Marriage in Scotland

 
Europe-related lists